Looking is an American comedy-drama television series created by Michael Lannan, based on his own short film Lorimer. The series, which is executive produced by Lannan, Andrew Haigh, David Marshall Grant and Sarah Condon, premiered on HBO on January 19, 2014.  Looking focuses on the professional and personal lives of a small group of gay men living in San Francisco, California and stars Jonathan Groff, Frankie J. Alvarez, Murray Bartlett, Raúl Castillo, Lauren Weedman and Russell Tovey.

 On March 25, 2015, HBO canceled the series, but announced that a special would serve as a finale, which premiered at the Frameline Film Festival on June 26, 2016, and debuted on the network on July 23, 2016.

Series overview 
{| class="wikitable" style="text-align: center;"
|-
! style="padding: 0 8px;" colspan="2" rowspan="2"| Season
! style="padding: 0 8px;" rowspan="2"| Episodes
! colspan="2"| Originally aired 
|-
! First aired
! Last aired
|-
|style="background: #3598FB;"|
| 1
| 8
| style="padding: 0 8px;"| 
| style="padding: 0 8px;"|  
|-
|style="background: #6900F3;"|
| 2
| 10
| 
| 
|-
|style="background: #48D1CC;"|
| colspan="2" |The Movie
| colspan="2" |June 26, 2016 July 23, 2016 
|-
|}

Episodes

Season 1 (2014)

Season 2 (2015)

Looking: The Movie (2016)

Home media releases

References

External links
 
 

Lists of American comedy-drama television series episodes